Oak City is the name of several towns in the United States:

Oak City, North Carolina
Oak City, Utah